KGKM-LD (channel 36) is a low-power television station licensed to Columbia, Missouri, United States, serving the Mid-Missouri area as an affiliate of the Spanish-language Telemundo network. It is a semi-satellite of Kansas City–based KGKC-LD (channel 39, licensed to Lawrence, Kansas) which is owned by SagamoreHill Broadcasting. KGKM-LD's transmitter is located on Edwards Road northwest of Ashland, Missouri.

History
On February 8, 2010, a construction permit was granted to DTV America for a low-power television station on UHF channel 36 at Jefferson City, Missouri, with call sign K36LJ-D. The permit was sold along with eight others to SagamoreHill Broadcasting on March 18, 2021. The station was granted a license to cover on January 10, 2022, and soon took the new call sign KGKM-LD.

Subchannels
The station's digital signal is multiplexed:

References

Telemundo network affiliates
Ion Television affiliates
Court TV affiliates
Defy TV affiliates
TrueReal affiliates
Scripps News affiliates
Low-power television stations in the United States
Television channels and stations established in 2022
2022 establishments in Missouri
GKM-LD
SagamoreHill Broadcasting